Nowghab-e Afzalabad (also Romanized as Nowghāb-e Afzalābād; also known as Nowghāb, Afzalābād, Naughāb, and Nūghāb) is a village in Fasharud Rural District, in the Central District of Birjand County, South Khorasan Province, Iran. At the 2016 census, its population was 125, in 56 families.

References 

Populated places in Birjand County